Annick Bonzon (born 20 March 1971 in Villars-sur-Ollon) is a Swiss former alpine skier who competed in the 1992 Winter Olympics.

External links
 sports-reference.com
 

1971 births
Living people
Swiss female alpine skiers
Olympic alpine skiers of Switzerland
Alpine skiers at the 1992 Winter Olympics
People from Aigle District
Sportspeople from the canton of Vaud
20th-century Swiss women

References